Sebastian Repo (born 23 June 1996) is a Finnish professional ice hockey forward. He is currently playing with Lukko in the Finnish Liiga. He was drafted by the Panthers, 184th overall, in the 2017 NHL Entry Draft.

Playing career
Repo first played as a youth at the Under 16 level as a 14-year old  in his native Finland, with hometown club, Lahti Pelicans. In showing elite development within the Pelicans program he eventually made his Liiga debut playing with Pelicans during the 2014–15 season. He ended the season, playing the latter half in the North American junior system with the Sioux City Musketeers in the United States Hockey League, however was passed over in the 2015 NHL Entry Draft.

In the beginning of his third season with the Pelicans in 2016–17, Repo was transferred to contending Liiga club, Tappara on 24 October 2016. Playing alongside future Panthers prospect Henrik Haapala, Repo increased his offensive output to post a season best of 24 assists and 35 points in 54 games. In the post-season, he co-led the league with 6 goals in helping Tappara claim the Liiga Championship.

As an overage prospect, Repo's impressive year was capped when he was selected by the Florida Panthers in the sixth round, 184th overall, in the 2017 NHL Entry Draft. On 3 July 2017, he was promptly signed to a three-year, entry-level contract with the Panthers. After attending the Panthers 2017 training camp and partaking in the pre-season, Repo was reassigned to continue his development on loan with Tappara for the 2017–18 season on 29 September 2017.

During his second year and final season under contract with the Panthers in North America, Repo continued his tenure in the American Hockey League with affiliate, the Springfield Thunderbirds. After contributing with 6 points in 17 games in the 2019–20 season, Repo was mutually released from his contract with the Panthers on 19 December 2019. 

Opting to return to his native Finland, Repo secured a contract for the remainder of the season with his third Liiga club, Lukko, on 20 December 2019.

International play

Repo participated in multiple junior selection squad's for Finland at the International level. Repo was eventually selected to participate in his first tournament at the 2016 World Junior Championships. In playing for the host country, Repo recorded 1 assist in 7 games, featuring in the final victory against Russia to help Finland claim the gold medal.

Career statistics

Regular season and playoffs

International

Awards and honours

References

External links

1996 births
Living people
Finnish ice hockey forwards
Florida Panthers draft picks
Lahti Pelicans players
Lukko players
Sioux City Musketeers players
Springfield Thunderbirds players
Tappara players
Sportspeople from Lahti